Dr. Belisario Domínguez is one of the 67 municipalities of Chihuahua, in northern Mexico. The municipal seat lies at San Lorenzo. The municipality covers an area of 7,877 km².

As of 2010, the municipality had a total population of 2,911, up from 1,453 as of 2005.

The municipality had 41 localities, none of which had a population over 1,000.

It acquired its present name in 1935 in honor of Belisario Domínguez, a senator for Chiapas murdered during the Mexican Revolution.

Geography

Towns and villages
The municipality has 23 localities.

References

Municipalities of Chihuahua (state)